Kölner Tennis- und Hockey-Club Stadion Rot-Weiss e.V., also known as KTHC Stadion Rot-Weiss or simply Rot-Weiss Köln, is a German field hockey and tennis club based in Cologne, North Rhine-Westphalia. The home ground is the Kölner Stadtwald.

The men's 1st XI have won the Bundesliga nine times, and have also competed in the Euro Hockey League, which they won in the 2016–17 season. The women's 1st XI have won the Bundesliga five times.

Honours

Men
Bundesliga
 Winners (10): 1971–72, 1972–73, 1973–74, 2008–09, 2009–10, 2012–13, 2014–15, 2015–16, 2019–2021, 2021–22
 Runners-up (9): 1965–66, 1969–70, 1970–71, 1974–75, 1989–90, 2011–12, 2013–14, 2016–17, 2017–18
Euro Hockey League
 Winners (1): 2016–17
 Runners-up (2): 2018–19, 2022
Indoor Bundesliga
 Winners (11): 1973–74, 1977–78, 1985–86, 1988–89, 1991–92, 1992–93, 1994–95, 2008–09, 2011–12, 2016–17, 2019–20
 Runners-up (7): 1964–65, 1975–76, 1989–90, 1990–91, 2013–14, 2014–15, 2015–16
EuroHockey Indoor Club Cup
 Winners (9): 1990, 1991, 1993, 1994, 1995, 1996, 2010, 2013, 2018
 Runners-up (1): 1992, 1997

Women
Bundesliga
 Winners (5): 1997–98, 2002–03, 2006–07, 2011–12, 2013–14
 Runners-up (7): 1998–99, 1999–00, 2003–04, 2004–05, 2007–08, 2010–11, 2015–16
EuroHockey Club Champions Cup
 Winners (1): 1999
EuroHockey Cup Winners Cup
 Winners (1): 2000
Indoor Bundesliga
 Winners (2): 1964–65, 2011–12
 Runners-up (2): 2005–06, 2006–07

Current squad

Men's squad

References

External links
Official website

 
Sport in Cologne
Field hockey clubs in Germany
Field hockey clubs established in 1906
1906 establishments in Germany